André Maugars (c. 1580 – c. 1645) was a French viola da gamba player. Marin Mersenne described him, along with Nicolas Hotman, as the most excellent French viola da gamba virtuoso, in particular, improviser of diminutions.

He is first identified as a musician attached to Henriette Marie de France, and follows her to London after her marriage to Charles I of England in 1625. After his return, he published a French translation of Francis Bacon's letter Advancement of learning. He worked first as a translator at the French court, later for the Cardinal Richelieu. This gained him in 1630 the office of prior of Saint-Pierre-Eynac in Le Puy-en-Velay. In 1634, he published a translation of another of Bacon's letters, Considerations Touching on a War with Spain. In 1637 or in the next years, he travelled to Rome. Following this journey, he wrote the account in the form of a letter  (Response to an Inquisitive Person on the Italian Feeling about Music, wrote in Rome on 1st October 1639) about his experiences from his Italian journey, which was published posthumously in 1672. This account is a valuable historical musical testimony about the contemporary Italian church music, oratorio and instrumental music in comparison with the French music of his time.

References

External links 
 A. Maugars: Response to an Inquisitive Person on the Italian Feeling about Music from C. MacClinton: Readings in the history of music in performance on Google Books
Ernest Thoinan, Maugars, célèbre joueur de viole, musicien du Cardinal de Richelieu... : sa biographie, suivie de sa "Response faite a un curieux sur le sentiment de la musique d'Italie, escrite à Rome le premier octobre 1639" : avec notes et éclaircissements. Paris : A. Claudin, 1865 Google books

French Baroque composers
French Baroque viol players
French expatriates in the Kingdom of England
1580s births
1645 deaths